Kurt Diemer (17 May 1893 – 13 December 1953) was a German international footballer.

References

1893 births
1953 deaths
Association football defenders
German footballers
Germany international footballers